Ma Menglu (born ) is a Chinese female  track cyclist. She won the gold medal in the  team pursuit  at the 2016 Asian Cycling Championships.

Major results
2016
1st  Team Pursuit, Asian Track Championships (with Chen Lulu, Huang Dongyan and Wang Hong)
2017
1st  Team Pursuit, National Track Championships (with Huang Dongyan, Jing Yali and Wang Hong)

References

External links
 Profile at cyclingarchives.com

1997 births
Living people
Chinese track cyclists
Chinese female cyclists
Place of birth missing (living people)
Olympic cyclists of China
Cyclists at the 2016 Summer Olympics
Cyclists at the 2018 Asian Games
Medalists at the 2018 Asian Games
Asian Games silver medalists for China
Asian Games medalists in cycling
21st-century Chinese women